Clipper Mill may refer to the following places in the United States:
Clipper Mills, California
Woodberry, Baltimore, Maryland